Shalcombe is a hamlet on the Isle of Wight towards the west in an area known as West Wight. It is in the civil parish of Shalfleet. It is situated along the B3399 road and is about 3.5 miles (5.6 km) east of Freshwater.

Hamlets on the Isle of Wight